Fundsmith is a London-based investment management company, founded in 2010 by Terry Smith. As of December 2019, Fundsmith manages £26bn in assets. Smith has been referred to as "the English Warren Buffett" after achieving superior investment returns with strategies similar to the U.S. investor.

Fundsmith employs a long-term, buy-and-hold investment philosophy. Its funds seek to own concentrated portfolios of quoted businesses that will compound in value over the years, chosen on the basis of company fundamentals, defensible competitive advantages, and attractive valuation. Individual stocks are selected via rigorous in-house, bottom-up analysis.

Investment strategy 
Fundsmith looks for companies generating high returns on capital and operating in sectors driven by a large number of everyday, repeat events and transactions, such as consumer staples and medical consumables. It avoids emerging technology firms, owing to their inherent unpredictability; it also avoids firms in heavily cyclical industries, such as airlines and real estate. Smith does not invest in banks, owing to their reliance on leverage and financial engineering. He was the No.1 rated bank analyst at Barclays in London from 1984-89.

Fundsmith also looks for companies with an established competitive advantage, for example, Automatic Data Processing, the payroll processor whose large installed base of software is said by Smith to give such firms "annuity-like characteristics". As Smith told The Telegraph newspaper in 2015: "The reality is that we don't seek to predict who will win, but rather to bet on a company that has already won."

Fundsmith invests on behalf of individuals, wealth managers, institutions, private banks, prominent families, charities and endowments. All four of the firm's partners invest their own money in the fund, with Smith having over £60m in it.

Investors in Fundsmith are charged 1% in management fees each year; the fund charges no performance fees, initial fees or redemption fees. The fund also eschews the higher operational costs associated with frequent dealing.

Funds 
Fundsmith operates three main investment vehicles: Fundsmith Equity Fund, an open-ended investment company ("OEIC"); Fundsmith Emerging Equities Trust, a listed closed-end investment trust established in 2014 and focused on emerging market equities (LSE: FEET); and Smithson Investment Trust, a listed closed-end investment trust established in 2018 focusing on global mid-cap equities (LSE: SSON).

Fundsmith also operates a Luxembourg SICAV, which is a feeder fund which only holds units in the OEIC; and a Delaware L.P. (Fundsmith Equity Fund L.P.) which follows the same strategy but is available to US tax payers who need a Schedule K-1 Form for the Internal Revenue Service.

Fundsmith Equity Fund 
Investing on a global basis, the Fund invests in businesses that can sustain a high return on capital employed; whose advantages are difficult to replicate and largely impervious to technological change; and where growth is generated through re-invested cash flows.

Fundsmith states it will hold 20-30 companies in its portfolio at any time; Smith has said that there are no more than 70 stocks in the world that match Fundsmith's investment criteria; their history typically spans several decades and multiple economic cycles.

Fundsmith invests in companies with large market capitalisations with shares that can be easily traded, to maintain liquidity for investors.

To July 2019, the fund had returned 383.3% since inception in November 2010, achieving an annualised growth rate of 19.7%; over the same period the fund outperformed growth in the MCSI World Index of Equities (179.2%) and UK bonds (42.2%). According to Bloomberg, the fund's performance (as of August 2019) puts it in the 97th, 99th and 99th percentiles vs. global peers on a trailing 1-, 3- and 5-year basis, respectively.

Fundsmith Emerging Equities Trust 
FEET uses the same investment strategy as the Fundsmith Equity Fund, but with one added dimension: the companies invested in by FEET will have the majority of their operations in, or revenue derived from, developing economies.

FEET was set up as a closed-ended trust due to the illiquid nature of emerging markets. At launch, Smith said FEET's portfolio will comprise 45-55 investments and about 20% of its investible universe are quoted subsidiaries, associates or franchisees of multinational companies that are also in Fundsmith Equity Fund's investable universe.

FEET invests in companies that have the majority of their operations in, or revenue derived from, developing economies, and which provide direct exposure to the rise of the consumer classes in those countries. Over half the fund is invested in Asia, mainly India; Smith is broadly sceptical of investing in China.
  
Smith has argued that "...one of the most reliable trends we have seen in the past 20 years is the rise of a consumer class in the emerging world. As they go through $7,000 per capita income, they start to want some sauce on their food to make it taste better. They need some convenience, even if it is just instant noodles".

From its inception to March 2016, the Trust's net asset value had fallen 4% and its share price has fallen 2%. Smith expects FEET to eventually outperform the Equity Fund, arguing that the end of the Fed's quantitative easing and weakness in the Chinese economy are an attractive entry point for long-term investors.

Fundsmith Sustainability Fund 

In November 2017, Fundsmith launched the Fundsmith Sustainability Fund, aimed at institutional investors and charities. It was developed from investments Terry Smith managed for Comic Relief. The fund has an ethical objective and excludes investments in morally contentious sectors such as oil, tobacco and gambling.

Operations 
Fundsmith is headquartered in the West End of London. The firm employs 16 people and has four owner-partners. Smith serves as CEO and CIO, and makes investment decisions along with Fundsmith's Head of Research Julian Robins, with whom he first worked 30 years ago.

Terry Smith 
Terry Smith, MNZM is a former chief executive of Collins Stewart and Tullett Prebon. A frequent media commentator on financial issues, Smith has blogged extensively on investment and political topics, and is a columnist for the Financial Times.

Smith first rose to prominence after the 1992 publication of his book Accounting for Growth, which exposed the misleading accounting practices adopted by bankrupt (but apparently successful) firms in the 90s. Smith was fired by his employer for refusing to withdraw the book; it went on to be one of the UK's bestselling non-fiction titles, at one stage outselling Stephen Hawking's A Brief History of Time and topping the non-fiction charts.

References

Investment management companies of the United Kingdom
2010 establishments in the United Kingdom
Financial services companies based in London